Mermelstein is a surname. Notable people with the surname include:

Edward Mermelstein (born 1967), American lawyer
Jeff Mermelstein (born 1957), American photographer
Max Mermelstein (1942–2008), American drug trafficker
Mel Mermelstein (born 1926), Hungarian-born Holocaust survivor